Kotkan Jäntevä is a Finnish football club from the city of Kotka.

Club was founded as a general sports club in 1940 but nowadays focuses only on football. Jäntevä was founded in Metsola district, a continental part of Kotka. Club has a number of youth teams for both boys and girls and for senior players. Club has played a total of 4 seasons in finnish premier division Mestaruussarja. In the end of 1953 season they were tied in points with VIFK, championship was decided on rematch in neutral ground in Turku, Jäntevä led the match at half time and controversially was denied a penalty while leading the match, but ended up losing 1-3.

Season to season

4 seasons in Mestaruussarja
16 seasons in Suomensarja
13 seasons in II Divisioona
8 seasons in Kolmonen
7 seasons in Nelonen
13 seasons in Vitonen
2 season in Kutonen

Official homepage

References

External links
Finnish Wikipedia
Club profile in Finnish FA official site

Football clubs in Finland
Association football clubs established in 1940
1940 establishments in Finland
Kotka